Lepidophanes gaussi, known as Günther's lanternfish, is a species of lanternfish distributed in the Atlantic Ocean between about 45°N and 50°S.

References

Myctophidae
Fish described in 1896